SS Dunearn was a British steel screw steamer of 2300 tons. On 26 August 1908, while sailing through the Korea Strait near the Gotō Islands during a typhoon, the ship sank with a loss of 51 of 53 crew members. The two survivors were rescued by the Japanese steamer Sakyo Maru. The Captain commanding the ship on her last voyage was Captain J. Graham. The two survivors were William Phillips, an engineer, and John Landon, a seaman.

Dunearn was built in 1895 by Short Brothers in Sunderland. On her final voyage, the ship was carrying a load of coal from Kuchinotzu to Singapore.

References

1895 ships
Maritime incidents in 1908
Merchant ships of the United Kingdom
Ships built on the River Wear
Shipwrecks in the Korea Strait
Steamships of the United Kingdom